Rekka may refer to:

Rekka (film), 2016 Indian Tamil language film
Rekka, Deadly Outlaw: Rekka (Japanese "Raging fire"), a 2002 Japanese yakuza film directed by Takashi Miike
Rekka Katakiri (片霧烈火 "Raging fire") a female Japanese singer under the self-published label Closed/Underground
Rekka, Japanese comic by Takao Saito List of series run in Weekly Shōnen Sunday
Rekka, Japanese album by Lecca (singer) 2005
Rekka no Ken, Fire Emblem (video game)